The St Leger is a greyhound racing competition held annually at Limerick Greyhound Stadium at Greenpark, Dock Road, Limerick, Ireland. 
The competition is an original classic race and was inaugurated in 1932 at Celtic Park in Belfast following the decision by the Irish Coursing Club to issue a new list of classic races. 

As was the practice at the time the Bord na gCon switched the event each year to a different track. Clonmel Greyhound Stadium, Shelbourne Park and Harolds Cross all played host  before it found a permanent home at the old Markets Field Greyhound Stadium in Limerick.

Past winners

Venues & Distances 
 Celtic Park (1932, 1943 550y) 
 Clonmel (1933 550y) 
 Shelbourne Park (1934, 1936, 1938, 1939 550y) 
 Harolds Cross (1935, 1937, 1942 550y) 
 Limerick (1940 & 1944-present 550y)

Sponsors
2002–2017 (Kerry Agribusiness)
2018–2018 (Barking Buzz App)
2019–2020 (Friends of Limerick)
2021–2022 (Matchbook Betting Exchange)

References

Greyhound racing competitions in Ireland
Greyhound racing competitions in Dublin (city)
Sport in Limerick (city)
Sport in County Limerick
Recurring sporting events established in 1932
1932 establishments in Ireland